Idriella lunata is a plant pathogen that causes root rot on strawberries and was first observed in California in 1956.

References

External links 
 Index Fungorum
 USDA ARS Fungal Database

Fungal strawberry diseases
Helotiaceae
Fungi described in 1956